Rodolfo Ariel Sandoval (born 4 October 1948) is a Uruguayan football midfielder who played for Uruguay in the 1970 FIFA World Cup. He also played for C.A. Peñarol.

References

External links
 FIFA profile

1948 births
Uruguayan footballers
Uruguay international footballers
Association football midfielders
Uruguayan Primera División players
Peñarol players
1970 FIFA World Cup players
Living people